Darreh-ye Ghazan-e Sofla (also Romanized as Darreh-ye Ghazān-e Soflá; also known as Darreh-ye Ghazān, Gazān, Darreh Gazān Pā’īn, Darreh-i-Gazān, and Darreh Jazān) is a village in Alqurat Rural District, in the Central District of Birjand County, South Khorasan Province, Iran. At the 2006 census, its population was 70, in 33 families.

References 

Populated places in Birjand County